Virtual airline may refer to:

 Virtual airline (economics), an airline that has outsourced as many possible operational and business functions as it can
 Virtual airline (hobby), a dedicated hobby organization that uses flight simulation to model the operations of an airline